Markbeech (sometimes styled Mark Beech) is a village in the civil parish of Hever in the Sevenoaks District of Kent, England. The village is located on  the northern ridges of the High Weald, nine miles (13 km) north-west of Tunbridge Wells.

The church, part of a united benefice with Hever and Four Elms, is dedicated to the Holy Trinity. There is a village hall, a pub - The Kentish Horse, and a thriving cricket club.

References

External links

Hever Parish Council
The three churches

Villages in Kent